Markus Bott (born 13 January 1962 in Pforzheim, West Germany) is a former boxer. He held the WBO world cruiserweight title in 1993.

Amateur career

1984 represented West Germany at the 1984 Los Angeles Olympic Games. Results were:
1st round had a bye
Lost to Anton Josipović (Yugoslavia) 1-4
1988 represented West Germany at the 1988 Seoul Olympic Games as a Light Heavyweight. Results were:
Defeated René Suetovius (East Germany) RSC 3
Lost to Nurmagomed Shanavazov (Soviet Union) 0-5

Professional career

Nicknamed "Cassius", Bott turned pro in 1989 and captured the WBO cruiserweight title with a decision win over Tyrone Booze in 1993.  He lost his belt in his first defense to Nestor Hipolito Giovannini that same year via split decision.  They rematched later that year, and Giovannini won via unanimous decision.  Bott retired for good after a TKO loss to Lee Manuel Ossie in 1998.

Professional boxing record

See also
List of cruiserweight boxing champions

External links

1962 births
Living people
Light-heavyweight boxers
Cruiserweight boxers
Heavyweight boxers
World cruiserweight boxing champions
World Boxing Organization champions
Sportspeople from Pforzheim
German male boxers
Olympic boxers of West Germany
Boxers at the 1984 Summer Olympics
Boxers at the 1988 Summer Olympics
20th-century German people